People First may refer to:

 People First Network aka P.F.Net, based in the Solomon Islands
 People First Party (Taiwan), a political party in Taiwan
 People First Party (Solomon Islands)
 People First Party (South Korea)
 Pipol First Party (Papua New Guinea)
 Bayan Muna, which translates to "People first", a political party in the Philippines
 People-first language, a concept similar to political correctness, regarding language use relating to people with disabilities